Animal Justice is the first EP by Welsh musician John Cale. It was released in September 1977 by record label Illegal. "Chickenshit" was Cale's response to his decapitation of a chicken during a gig in Croydon on April 24, 1977. This prompted the vegetarian rhythm section of Mike Visceglia and Joe Stefko to walk off and leave Cale's band.

Recording 

Animal Justice was recorded at Chalk Farm Studios in London, England. Two other songs were recorded during these sessions, "Jack the Ripper (In the Moulin Rouge)" and "Ton Ton Macoute", but were not released.

Content 

The album cover is by rock photographer Jill Furmanovsky.

Release 

Animal Justice was released in September 1977 by record label Illegal.

In 1999 this EP was released as bonus tracks on the reissue of the live album Sabotage/Live (1979).

Track listing 

 "Chickenshit" (Cale) − 3:25
 "Memphis" (Chuck Berry) − 3:15
 "Hedda Gabler" (Cale) − 7:53

Personnel 
 John Cale − vocals, guitar, piano, viola
 Ritchie Flieger − guitar, backing vocals on "Chickenshit"
 Jimmy Bain − bass guitar
 Bruce Brody − Moog synthesizer
 Kevin Currie − drums
Chris Spedding - guitar on "Memphis" 
Jane Friedman − backing vocals on "Chickenshit"

"Chickenshit" contains part of a telephone conversation between Cale and Joe Stefko at the Portobello Hotel, London in April 1977.

References 

John Cale EPs
1977 debut EPs
Albums produced by John Cale
Illegal Records albums